Huneric, Hunneric or Honeric (died December 23, 484) was King of the (North African) Vandal Kingdom (477–484) and the oldest son of Gaiseric. He abandoned the imperial politics of his father and concentrated mainly on internal affairs. He was married to Eudocia, daughter of western Roman Emperor Valentinian III (419–455) and Licinia Eudoxia. The couple had one child, a son named Hilderic.

Huneric was the first Vandal king who used the title King of the Vandals and Alans. Despite adopting this style, and that of the Vandals of maintaining their sea-power and their hold on the islands of the western Mediterranean, Huneric did not have the prestige that his father Gaiseric had enjoyed with other states.

Early life 
Huneric was a son of King Gaiseric, and was sent to Italy as a hostage in 435, when his father made a treaty with the Western emperor Valentinian III. Huneric became king of the Vandals on his father's death on 25 January 477. Like Gaiseric he was an Arian, and his reign is chiefly memorable for his persecution of Catholic Christians in his dominions. Eudocia, daughter of Valentinian III, was Huneric's wife.

His reign 
Huneric was a fervent adherent to Arianism. Yet his reign opened with making a number of positive overtures towards the local Roman population. Following the visit of a diplomatic mission from the Eastern Roman Empire led by Alexander, Huneric restored properties seized by his father from the merchants of Carthage. He also lifted the policy of persecuting the local Catholics (Nicene Christians), allowing them to hold a synod wherein they elected a new Catholic bishop of Carthage, Eugenius, after a vacancy of 24 years.
 
However, not long after the ordination of Eugenius, Huneric reversed himself and began to once again persecute Catholics. Furthermore, he tried to make Catholic property fall to the state, but when this caused too much protest from the Eastern Roman Emperor, he chose to banish a number of Catholics to a faraway province instead. On February 1, 484 he organized a meeting of Catholic bishops with Arian bishops, but on February 24, 484 he forcibly removed the Catholic bishops from their offices and banished some to Corsica. A few were executed, including the former proconsul Victorian along with Frumentius and other wealthy merchants, who were killed at Hadrumetum after refusing to become Arians. Among those exiled was Vigilius, bishop of Thapsus, who published a theological treatise against Arianism.

Additionally, Huneric murdered many members of the Hasdingi dynasty and also persecuted Manichaeans.

Towards the end of his reign, the Moors in the Aurès Mountains (in modern-day Algeria) successfully rebelled from Vandal rule. 
 
Upon his death Huneric was succeeded by his nephew Gunthamund, who reigned until 496. A lurid account of Huneric's death by putrefaction and "an abundance of worms" is included in the Historia persecutionis Africanae Provinciae, temporibus Genserici et Hunirici regum Wandalorum (History of the African Province Persecution, in the Times of Genseric and Huneric, the Kings of the Vandals), written by his contemporary, Victor of Vita, although it is probable that this particular section was added at a later date.

See also 
 Hunericopolis, the Catholic Metropolitan Archbishopric Hadrumetum renamed after him

References 

5th-century Arian Christians
Christian monarchs
5th-century monarchs in Africa
484 deaths
Christian anti-Gnosticism
Kings of the Vandals
Year of birth unknown